South Dakota Highway 37 (SD 37) is a state route that runs across eastern South Dakota. It begins at the Nebraska border northeast of Niobrara, Nebraska, as a continuation of Nebraska Highway 14. It runs to the North Dakota border north of Hecla, where it continues as North Dakota Highway 1.

Route description

History
South Dakota 37 was in place by 1926, and largely has used the same alignment since.  The only significant exception was in northeast South Dakota, where SD 37 originally went westward from Groton to Bath, then north via Columbia to Houghton, where it continued to Hecla.  This segment was rerouted to the current alignment by 1929.

On the south end, the road ended at the Missouri River at Running Water.  A seasonal ferry was in place to carry traffic across the river.  A direct connection via bridge did not open until 1998 when the Chief Standing Bear Memorial Bridge was completed.

In the early and mid-1930s, the segment between Huron and Tripp was co-numbered as U.S. Route 281.  This concurrency was dropped by 1936, when US 281 was realigned further west.

The segment between Huron and Mitchell was upgraded to a 4-lane expressway, and was largely completed by 2004.  A minor rerouting around the west end of Mitchell occurred, resulting in a  concurrency with Interstate 90.

Legal definition
The route of SD 37 is defined in South Dakota Codified Laws § 31-4-158.

Major intersections

Related route

South Dakota Highway 37A (SD 37A) is a north–south state highway in the U.S. state of South Dakota. SD 37A's southern terminus is at SD 37 in Tripp, and the northern terminus is at US 18 north of Tripp.

See also

 List of state highways in South Dakota

References

External links

 South Dakota Highways Page: Highways 31-60

037
Transportation in Bon Homme County, South Dakota
Transportation in Hutchinson County, South Dakota
Transportation in Davison County, South Dakota
Transportation in Sanborn County, South Dakota
Transportation in Beadle County, South Dakota
Transportation in Spink County, South Dakota
Transportation in Brown County, South Dakota